During the 1995–96 English football season, Grimsby Town F.C. competed in the Football League First Division.

Transfers

Transfers In

Loans In

Transfers Out

Season summary
In the 1995–96 season, Grimsby had a disappointing campaign and Laws' initially successful managerial reign deteriorated after he clashed with Grimsby player Ivano Bonetti. Laws reportedly threw a plate of chicken wings at the Italian following a 3–2 defeat at Luton Town in February 1996 and caused the popular player to leave the club at the end of the season. Grimsby finished the season in 17th place and were in the battle to avoid relegation right up to the penultimate game of the season.

Final league table

Results
Grimsby Town's score comes first

Legend

Football League First Division

FA Cup

League Cup

Squad

References

Grimsby Town F.C. seasons
Grimsby Town